The  is a facility of the Japan Aerospace Exploration Agency (JAXA), located on the coast of the Sea of Japan in the city of Noshiro in Akita Prefecture, Japan.

History
The Noshiro Rocket Testing Center (NTC) was established in 1962 as one of the affiliated facilities of the Institute of Industrial Science of the University of Tokyo, which became the Institute of Space and Astronautical Science (ISAS) in 1964. The testing center was involved in the development and testing of sounding rockets and the solid-fuel rocket engines which were used on the Mu series of launch vehicles.

From 1975, the Noshiro Testing Center was involved in the research, development and testing of liquid-fuel rocket engines. With the M-V launch vehicle program, the facilities were extensively upgraded with a large solid motor air combustion test building and an upper motor high altitude performance test facility completed by 1992. The static firing test for the M-V rocket engines took place at Noshiro.

In addition, a successful static test firing of the ATREX, an experimental precooled jet engine that works as a turbojet at low speeds and a ramjet up to Mach 6.0 occurred in 1992. From 1998, the site has been active in the Reusable Vehicle Testing program to develop an air-breathing engine which uses less fuel than a rocket and can therefore transport a larger payload.

References
 Harvey, Brian. Emerging Space Powers: The New Space Programs of Asia, the Middle East and South America. Springer (2011)  
 Spagnulo, Marcello. Space Program Management: Methods and Tools. Springer (2102)

External links
JAXA official home page
JAXA brochure on Noshiro Test Center

1962 establishments in Japan
Space program of Japan
Space technology research institutes
Buildings and structures in Akita Prefecture
Noshiro, Akita
Rocket launch sites